Mercado is the Portuguese and Spanish word for market. It may refer to:

Public markets
 Mercado de las Carnes, a former meat market in Ponce, Puerto Rico
 Mercado Central, Valencia, a public market in Valencia, Spain
 Mercado Central de Santiago, the central market of Santiago de Chile
 Mercado Jamaica, Mexico City, a traditional market in Mexico City
 Mercado Modelo (Montevideo), a central fruit and vegetable wholesale market in Montevideo
 Mercado de Sonora, a traditional market in Mexico City

People with the surname
 Jerges Mercado Suárez, Bolivian politician
 Juan Miguel Mercado, Spanish cyclist
 Luis Edgardo Mercado Jarrín, Peruvian politician
 Gabriel Mercado, Argentine footballer
 Joseph Mercado, Filipino academic
 Mai Mercado (born 1980), Danish politician
 Melinda Mercado, American soccer player
 Noel Kempff Mercado, Bolivian biologist
 Oscar Mercado, baseball player
 Scarleth Mercado, Nicaraguan weightlifter
 Walter Mercado, Puerto Rican astrologer

Other
 De Mercado, a Spanish surname
 Mercado Integrado Latinoamericano, a program to integrate the stock exchange markets of Chile, Colombia and Peru
 Mercado a Término de Buenos Aires, the Buenos Aires Futures and Options Exchange

See also
 Mercato (disambiguation)
 Market (disambiguation)
 Markt (disambiguation)